Gaétan Boucher (May 5, 1956 – May 4, 2016) was a Canadian-born Swiss ice hockey centre. He spent the majority of his career playing for HC Villars in Switzerland.

Boucher participated as a member of the Swiss national team three times, including the 1988 Winter Olympics.

References

External links

1956 births
2016 deaths
Canadian expatriate ice hockey players in Switzerland
EHC Biel players
Genève-Servette HC players
HC La Chaux-de-Fonds players
HC Sierre players
HC Villars players
Ice hockey players at the 1988 Winter Olympics
Lausanne HC players
Olympic ice hockey players of Switzerland
Swiss ice hockey centres
Quebec Remparts players
SC Bern players
Trois-Rivières Draveurs players